Levi Copestake was an English professional footballer. An outside left, he played in the Football League for Blackpool and Bristol City.

References

1886 births
1968 deaths
People from Kiveton Park
Sportspeople from Yorkshire
Association football outside forwards
English footballers
Kiveton Park F.C. players
Worksop Town F.C. players
Blackpool F.C. players
Bristol City F.C. players
Exeter City F.C. players
English Football League players